Enrico Zanoncello (born 2 August 1997) is an Italian racing cyclist, who currently rides for UCI ProTeam .

Major results
2014
 9th Trofeo comune di Vertova
2018
 8th GP Laguna
2019
 7th Circuito del Porto
2020
 1st Coppa San Geo
2022
 2nd Grand Prix Megasaray
 6th Umag Trophy

References

External links

1997 births
Living people
Italian male cyclists
Cyclists from the Province of Verona